The following are the football (soccer) events of the year 1938 throughout the world.

Winners club national championship 
 Argentina: Independiente
 France: FC Sochaux-Montbéliard
 Germany: Hannover 96
 Italy: Internazionale Milano F.C.
 Netherlands: Feyenoord Rotterdam
 Paraguay: Olimpia Asunción
 Poland: Ruch Chorzów
 Romania: Ripensia Timișoara
 Scotland:
Scottish Cup: East Fife
 Turkey: Güneş SK
 Soviet Union: Spartak Moscow

Manchester City F.C. become the only team in history to be relegated the year after being champions of England.

International tournaments 
1938 British Home Championship (October 23, 1937 – April 9, 1938)

 FIFA World Cup in France (June 4 – 19 1938)
 
 
 
 1938 Bolivarian Games

Births 
 14 March: Árpád Orbán, Hungarian footballer (died 2008)
 17 March: Adolf Knoll, Austrian football player (died 2018)
 19 April: Stanko Poklepović, Croatian football player and manager (died 2018)
 7 June: Armando Tobar, Chilean international footballer (died 2016)
 25 June: Enver Yulgushov, Russian professional footballer and coach (died 2022)
 26 June: Gene Gaines, American football (soccer) player
 29 June:
 József Gelei, Hungarian football player and manager
 Giampaolo Menichelli, Italian winger
 2 July: Marcel Artelesa, French international footballer (died 2016)
 3 July: Sjaak Swart, Dutch footballer
 6 July: 
 Uli Maslo, German football player and manager
 Oleh Bazylevych, Ukrainian footballer, coach, and sport administrator (died 2018)
 8 July: Vojtech Masný, Slovak football player
 12 July: Lin Shllaku, Albanian footballer (died 2016)
 28 July: Luis Aragonés, Spanish international football player and manager (died 2014)
 28 August: Đorđe Pavlić, Yugoslavian international footballer (died 2015)
 2 December: Luis Artime, Argentine internationalfootballer
 9 December: Nikola Kotkov, Bulgarian international footballer (died 1971)

Deaths

References

 
Association football by year